The Saudi Arabian Interbank Offered Rate (SAIBOR) is a daily reference rate, published by the Saudi Central Bank (SCB or SAMA), based on the averaged interest rates at which Saudi banks offer to lend unsecured funds to other banks in the Saudi Riyal wholesale money market (or interbank market).

On 20 November 2016 Thomson Reuters was approved as the SAIBOR administrator and calculation agent by SAMA.

Scope 
SAIBOR is the key interbank rate in Saudi Arabia, and the benchmark for commercial and consumer lending rates. 

It is also known as SIBOR, Saudi Interbank Offered Rate, but can be confused with SIBOR, Singapore Interbank Offered Rate.

Calculation and Tenors 
Fixing is conducted each business day at 11 AM KSA time. The fixing rate is the average of the contributions excluding the two highest and two lowest contributions for each tenor.

As of 20 November 2016 the following tenors are calculated:
 Overnight
 1 Week
 1 Month
 3 Months
 6 Months
 12 Months
Previously the 2 Month and 9 Month tenors were calculated but have since been discontinued.

Contributor Banks 
As of 20 November 2016 the following banks contribute to SAIBOR:
 Arab National Bank
 Bank Aljazira
 Banque Saudi Fransi
 AL-AWAL Bank
 Emirates NBD
 Gulf International Bank
 National Bank of Kuwait
 National Commercial Bank
 Riyad Bank
 Saudi British Bank
 Samba Financial Group
 Saudi Investment Bank
 Alinma Bank
 Bank Albilad

References

Finance in Saudi Arabia
Interest rates
Reference rates